Viktor Ugryumov (born 19 August 1939) is a former Soviet equestrian and Olympic champion. He won a gold medal in team dressage at the 1980 Summer Olympics in Moscow.

References

1939 births
Living people
Soviet male equestrians
Russian dressage riders
Olympic equestrians of the Soviet Union
Olympic gold medalists for the Soviet Union
Olympic bronze medalists for the Soviet Union
Equestrians at the 1976 Summer Olympics
Equestrians at the 1980 Summer Olympics
Olympic medalists in equestrian
Medalists at the 1980 Summer Olympics